Papicha is a 2019 internationally co-produced drama film directed by Mounia Meddour. It was screened in the Un Certain Regard section at the 2019 Cannes Film Festival. It was selected as the Algerian entry for the Best International Feature Film at the 92nd Academy Awards, but it was not nominated. It became the most successful African film directed by a woman at the French box office.

Plot
Set in the 1990s during the Algerian Civil War, Papicha tells the story of Nedjma, an 18-year-old student who loves fashion and going out with her girlfriends. This lifestyle is challenged by a growing campaign for women to wear the burqa. Her life changes after a dramatic attack and Nedjma decides to create a fashion show as a symbol of resistance.

Cast
 Marwan Zeghbib as Karim
 Lyna Khoudri as Nedjma
 Nadia Kaci as Madame Kamissi
 Ali Damiche as Omer

Reception

Awards

See also
 List of submissions to the 92nd Academy Awards for Best International Feature Film
 List of Algerian submissions for the Academy Award for Best International Feature Film

References

External links
 

2019 drama films
2010s French-language films
Algerian drama films
French drama films
Algerian war films
Algerian Civil War
Films about religious violence
Films about fashion designers
Best First Feature Film César Award winners
2010s French films